Asher Dov Angel (born September 6, 2002) is an American actor. He began his career as a child actor in the 2008 film Jolene, starring Jessica Chastain. He is known for his role as Jonah Beck in the 2017 Disney Channel series Andi Mack. Angel portrayed Billy Batson in the 2019 DC Extended Universe film Shazam! and its 2023 sequel Shazam! Fury of the Gods.

Personal life
Angel was born in Phoenix, Arizona, and lived in Paradise Valley, Arizona. His parents are Jody and Coco Angel, and he is the oldest of three siblings, with a brother and sister. He is Jewish. He sings and plays the guitar.

Career
At the age of 5, Angel appeared in the 2008 film Jolene. Angel started his career by appearing in numerous theater productions. At the age of 7, Desert Stages Theatre held auditions for the musical Oliver! and, with his parents' permission, Angel auditioned and won a role in the production. His mother promised to take him to Los Angeles if he "put in the work and [did] 30 [local] shows", and he went on to act in multiple plays including The Little Mermaid, Seussical, Mary Poppins, and Into the Woods at the Desert Stages Theatre in Scottsdale. His mother kept her promise, and Angel traveled to Los Angeles where, at age 12, he auditioned for and won the part of Jonah Beck in the Disney Channel television series Andi Mack. His whole family moved to Utah to accommodate filming for the series.

In April 2019, Angel played the lead role of Billy Batson, with Zachary Levi starring as his adult superhero alter ego, in the film adaptation of DC Comics' Shazam! The film, a further installment of the DC Extended Universe, was released to critical acclaim. Angel released his debut single "One Thought Away", featuring Wiz Khalifa, on June 6, 2019. He reprised his role of Billy Batson in Shazam! Fury of the Gods, which was released on March 17, 2023.

In February 2022, Angel joined the cast of Hulu's Darby and the Dead.

Filmography

Awards and nominations

References

External links

2002 births
Male actors from Phoenix, Arizona
American male child actors
American male film actors
American male television actors
Jewish American male actors
Living people
People from Paradise Valley, Arizona
21st-century American male actors
21st-century American Jews